Raimondas Šiugždinis (born October 8, 1967) is an dinghy sailor from Lithuania. World and Europe champion in 1997. One of the founders of RS-280 class.

Results

National Championships

External links
R.Šiugždinis at Lithuanian Sport Encyclopedia

Olympic sailors of Lithuania
Sailors at the 1992 Summer Olympics – 470
Lithuanian male sailors (sport)
1967 births
Living people
Lithuanian Sportsperson of the Year winners